Benjamin Michael McAdams (born December 5, 1974) is an American politician and attorney who served as the U.S. representative from Utah's 4th congressional district from 2019 to 2021. He was the only Democratic member of Utah's congressional delegation, and a member of the Blue Dog Coalition. From 2013 to 2019, he served as mayor of Salt Lake County, and from 2009 to 2012, he was the Utah state senator from the 2nd district, which includes Salt Lake City, South Salt Lake, and a portion of West Valley. McAdams was elected to Congress in 2018, narrowly defeating two-term Republican incumbent Mia Love. In 2020, McAdams ran for reelection, but he lost to Republican challenger Burgess Owens.

Early life and education
McAdams was born in West Bountiful, Utah. He has a bachelor's degree in political science from the University of Utah and a J.D. with honors from Columbia Law School. At Columbia McAdams was a member of the Columbia Human Rights Law Review.

Early career

Legal career 
After graduating from law school, McAdams briefly worked in New York City as an associate at the law firm Davis Polk & Wardwell. McAdams and his family then returned to Utah, where he joined the law firm Dorsey & Whitney in Salt Lake City, working in securities law. McAdams then became Senior Advisor to Salt Lake City Mayor Ralph Becker.

McAdams has served as an adjunct faculty member at the University of Utah College of Law.

Utah Senate
McAdams was elected to replace Scott McCoy as the senator for Utah's second district in a special election on December 19, 2009. He was elected to a four-year term on November 2, 2010.

Legislation

In March 2011 McAdams proposed a bill banning employment and housing discrimination against gay and transgender Utahns. His motion to hold a hearing on it failed on a party-line vote. Salt Lake City passed a similar measure in 2009.

Scorecards and ratings

McAdams received a 75% rating from the advocacy group Parents for Choice in Education during the 2012 legislative session and a 77% rating from the National Education Association. He also received an 82% score from the Utah Taxpayers Association, the highest-scoring Democrat that year. The Salt Lake Tribune identified McAdams as the most liberal-leaning member of the Utah Senate in 2011, with a conservative rating of 34.4% that year. In 2012, however, the Tribune identified him as the third-most conservative Democratic Utah state senator (out of eight).

McAdams was given a rating of 33% conservative by the Sutherland Institute, a fiscally and socially conservative political action committee, based on his time in the Utah state senate. He also has a 100% rating from the Utah Sierra Club, which supports greater environmental protection.

Committee assignments

Mayor of Salt Lake County

Elections

In November 2011 McAdams announced his campaign to succeed Peter Corroon as mayor of Salt Lake County, Utah. On November 6, 2012, McAdams was elected with 54% of the vote, defeating Republican nominee Mark Crockett. McAdams resigned from the state senate before taking office as mayor.

McAdams was mentioned as a potential candidate in Utah's 2016 Senate race or Utah's 2016 gubernatorial race, but did not run for either position. He was reelected to a second term as Salt Lake County Mayor in November 2016 with 59% of the vote.

Homelessness

McAdams was tasked by the Utah Legislature to select a location for a new homeless shelter in Salt Lake County, outside of Salt Lake City. According to the Deseret News, the task was considered politically damaging, as strong local opposition was expected regardless of the ultimate shelter location. McAdams recommended South Salt Lake, and was opposed by Cherie Wood, the city's mayor. Previously, Draper mayor Troy Walker had volunteered two sites for the shelter in Draper, before rescinding the offer under public pressure.

Before making his recommendation, McAdams spent two nights on the streets of Salt Lake City, posing as a homeless person to gather information. Although tasked with recommending a site for the shelter, McAdams pledged to not support the center's groundbreaking unless the Utah Legislature passes a bill to create a pool of revenue from other cities to help with funding.

McAdams has called for a "radically different approach ... to address homelessness," and has called homelessness a "stubborn and complex social challenge."

Taxes and budgets

In 2014 McAdams supported the renewal of a Zoos, Arts, and Parks (ZAP) tax in Salt Lake County. The ZAP tax amounts to 1 cent on every $10 spent. It partially funds more than 190 county arts and cultural organizations, as well as 30 parks and recreation facilities, including Hogle Zoo, Tracy Aviary, the Loveland Living Planet Aquarium, and others. The tax was approved by voters in 2014, with nearly 77% of county voters in favor.

McAdams's proposed 2018 county budget was passed by the County Council on a 5–4 vote. The opposition was due to an overrun of $367,000 over the preliminary budget request (of $1.3 billion) that McAdams had submitted previously. Included in the budget were funds for a partial opening of Oxbow Jail, a 2.5 percent pay raise for county employees, and funds for new libraries.

McAdams proposed a county budget for 2019 that included additional funds over previous years' budgets for public safety, including funds to fully open Oxbow Jail, and to help the local sheriff hire and retain public safety officers. The budget would not include a tax increase, and McAdams has said that overall new requests were reduced by around $18 million. After some modifications, the Salt Lake County Council passed the budget unanimously.

Economic and community development

McAdams supported a Utah bill that gave Salt Lake County's townships the power to decide their future governance structure. This led to the election in which Millcreek residents voted to incorporate.

As Salt Lake County mayor, McAdams sat on the board of directors of the United Way of Salt Lake County. He implemented a "pay-for-success" model that invited third-party investors to pay for preschool and gain a return on their investment when specified benchmarks were met. In 2016 the United Way recognized McAdams for this model and its "data-driven collaborative approach."

McAdams opposed a proposed Facebook data center in West Jordan in 2016. West Jordan city leaders blamed opposition from Salt Lake County, and McAdams in particular, for Facebook's ultimate choice to locate the data center in New Mexico instead of West Jordan. The $2.5 billion data center would have received $195 million from the city and county in tax breaks. McAdams believed that the data center was too expensive, since it would have directly produced a maximum of only 130 jobs. Supporters of the data center argued it would have drawn additional development and investment to the region.

Salt Lake County maintained an AAA bond rating throughout McAdams's tenure as mayor.

U.S. House of Representatives

Elections

2018 

On October 18, 2017, McAdams announced that he would seek the Democratic nomination to oppose incumbent Representative Mia Love, a Republican representing Utah's 4th congressional district. On April 28, 2018, McAdams won the Democratic nomination at the party's convention. With the backing of 72% of the convention delegates, McAdams avoided a primary campaign.

During the campaign McAdams distanced himself from the House Democratic leadership, saying that he would not support Nancy Pelosi for Speaker if elected.

In June 2018 CNN reported that the race was considered "consequential to both parties" because Love had "stood up to [President Donald Trump] on immigration" and "because national Democrats [saw] McAdams as one of their best chances to gain a foothold on red turf".

McAdams was endorsed by the Blue Dog Coalition, a House caucus of conservative and moderate Democrats that stresses fiscal responsibility. He was also endorsed by the League of Conservation Voters

On November 20 final results showed that McAdams had won by 694 votes, or .257%. His margin of victory was greater than the .25% needed to automatically trigger a recount. About $11.4 million combined was spent by Love's and McAdams' campaigns, and outside groups on their behalf, making it one of the most expensive campaigns in Utah history.

With his win, McAdams became the first Democratic member of congress elected from Utah since Jim Matheson won reelection to the 4th district in 2012.

2020 

McAdams was challenged by Republican Burgess Owens, a former NFL player and frequent contributor on Fox News. A United Utah Party candidate, Jonia Broderick, dropped out in October and endorsed McAdams.

Outside groups spent heavily to oppose McAdams. On November 17 the election was called for Burgess Owens, with a margin less than 1%. Owens won the election by overperforming in traditionally Democratic Salt Lake County and he ultimately defeated McAdams by approximately 3,000 votes, a larger margin than McAdams won by in 2018.

Tenure

McAdams was the only Democrat in Utah's congressional delegation during his tenure.

He voted for Stephanie Murphy, a Democratic representative from Florida, for House speaker. He had previously joined other Democratic House members in signing a letter pledging to oppose Nancy Pelosi as House speaker.

McAdams was one of over 100 members of Congress who asked to have their pay withheld during the 2018–19 United States federal government shutdown.

In April 2019 McAdams introduced legislation proposing a Balanced Budget Amendment to the U.S. Constitution. He was supported by the other 26 members of the Blue Dog Caucus. The amendment would allow deficits during wars, recessions, or sustained periods of high unemployment. It would also protect Social Security and Medicare from court-mandated budget cuts. As justification for the amendment, McAdams cited the $22 trillion debt, $1 trillion annual deficit, increasing interest payments, and lack of efforts by either party to curtail spending growth. Liberal-leaning news sources have criticized the plan: Esquire called it a "pry-bar ... to open the entire Constitution to revision," while Splinter News predicted that "domestic spending programs and the safety net will always be up first on the chopping block if cuts need to be made." An opinion article in The Guardian newspaper accused McAdams and the Blue Dog Coalition of trying to "kill the Green New Deal", which would require deficit spending, and argued that "there’s nothing inherently dangerous about a growing deficit."

A July 2019 poll showed McAdams with the highest approval rating of any member of Utah's congressional delegation.

McAdams introduced a bill to help victims of Ponzi schemes recover their money. On November 18, 2019, it passed the House of Representatives with bipartisan support. Utah has the highest number of known Ponzi schemes per capita in the United States.

McAdams introduced an amendment to a funding bill to prevent resumption of nuclear weapons testing, which passed the House in July. On the House floor, he said, "explosive nuclear testing causes irreparable harm to human health and to our environment and jeopardizes the U.S. leadership role on nuclear nonproliferation."

Committee assignments 

 Committee on Financial Services
 Subcommittee on Consumer Protection and Financial Institutions
 Subcommittee on National Security, International Development and Monetary Policy
 Committee on Science, Space, and Technology
 Subcommittee on Environment
 Subcommittee on Research and Technology

Caucus memberships 

 Blue Dog Coalition
 Congressional LGBT Equality Caucus
 New Democrat Coalition
 Problem Solvers Caucus

Political positions 
McAdams is a self-described moderate Democrat. He has emphasized his efforts to work with Republicans, and has said on multiple occasions that he believes that it is important to work together to solve problems.

According to the UCLA Department of Political Science's DW-NOMINATE scores, McAdams was the most conservative Democrat in the 116th House. He has a lifetime score of 82% from the pro-business U.S. Chamber of Commerce based on his House voting record.

Abortion
McAdams has identified himself as pro-life but voted against several anti-abortion bills as a state senator. He has said he "believes in the sanctity of life at all stages", and "opposes abortion except in cases of rape, incest, danger to the mother's life, and in certain other rare circumstances."

As a Utah state senator, McAdams opposed a bill to increase the waiting period for abortions from 24 to 72 hours, a bill mandating biannual inspections of abortion clinics, a bill requiring doctors to describe ultrasound images to patients, and a bill that would have allowed health care providers to refuse to perform abortions on religious grounds. He later said he voted against them because he considered them poorly written, and was concerned about their unintended legal consequences, not because he supported abortion.

During the 2018 election campaign McAdams described himself as pro-life, referring to his "deeply held beliefs about the sanctity of life", and said that Mia Love's charge that he is an abortion advocate was "offensive". McAdams also said "decisions about terminating a pregnancy should [be] made by a woman in consultation with her physician, family members and faith counselors she trusts". He also said during a town hall meeting:

During the current 116th session of Congress McAdams was one of three Democrats to sign a Republican-led petition to advance the "Born-Alive Abortion Survivors Protection Act", an anti-abortion bill.

Economic issues

Although not a member of Congress when it passed, McAdams expressed opposition to the Tax Cuts and Jobs Act of 2017, because of the expected $1.5 trillion increase of the national debt over 10 years. He also believes it favors the "wealthy over the middle class." He has stated he believes in tax code modernization, but that he considered the tax reform bill "fiscally irresponsible," and believes that its cost "is borrowed from future generations."

McAdams supports measures to reduce the federal deficit, including a Balanced Budget Amendment to the US Constitution.

In 2019 McAdams voted against a House bill to increase the federal minimum wage to $15 per hour. He said he supports a higher minimum wage, but wants a system that sets the rate based on the regional cost of living and purchasing power.

In July 2019, McAdams called on Democratic House leadership to advance the passage of the USMCA trade agreement negotiated between the Trump administration, Mexico, and Canada. On January 29, 2020, President Trump signed the USMCA into law after passing both the House and Senate with bipartisan majorities.

McAdams was one of 18 Democrats who joined all House Republicans to oppose a $2.2 trillion COVID-19 relief stimulus bill sponsored by Democrats. The bill, which has been the subject of negotiations for months, passed the House but has not received a vote in the Senate. McAdams said the bill “is a step in the right direction but is still weighted down with partisan wish list items unrelated to the COVID crisis.“

Energy and environment

McAdams supports increased renewable energy sources and the development of new technologies. He supports a national energy portfolio that is balanced between renewables and traditional fossil fuel sources, as well as reductions in vehicle emissions.

McAdams supports efforts to improve Utah's air quality. He requested that the House Transportation and Infrastructure Committee double the funding available for the Utah Transit Authority to purchase electric buses, in an effort to improve air quality. Air quality in Salt Lake City and other Utah urban areas consistently ranks among the worst in the US. Together with Representative John Curtis, McAdams introduced legislation that would make projects like FrontRunner eligible for federal funding—in FrontRunner's case, by installing more miles of double track to increase service.

McAdams does not support the Green New Deal; he has said he has "some concerns and [doesn't] have a lot of confidence in big heavy-handed government programs." Instead he has said he wants to see "government working hand-in-hand with the private sector" to harness "the creativity and entrepreneurship of the private sector... to solve [the] crisis" of climate change. McAdams believes in "the threat of climate change," which he says is "real... and we are seeing it... in Utah." McAdams voted for a bill to block the Trump administration from leaving the Paris Agreement. He was the only member of the Utah congressional delegation to do so. In August 2019, McAdams called climate change "the greatest challenge of our time," calling for bipartisan efforts to address it, and for Utah to be a leader in those efforts.

Gun policy 
McAdams has said that he used guns frequently growing up as recreation and supports the Second Amendment but believes in more responsible gun ownership laws. McAdams owns several firearms for recreational use.

In February 2019, McAdams voted for a bill requiring background checks for all gun buyers. All of Utah's other representatives voted against it. At the same time, he voted for a Republican-backed amendment requiring Immigration and Customs Enforcement to be notified when an illegal immigrant attempts to buy a firearm and is caught during the background check. McAdams also voted against a Democratic-sponsored measure to extend the waiting period to buy a firearm from 3 days to 10 days. He stated: "as a supporter of the Second Amendment, I believe most gun owners are responsible, law-abiding citizens. ... Adding more bureaucracy and delays for a gun buyer to navigate does not improve the background check system."

Healthcare

While Salt Lake County mayor, McAdams called for Congress to make fixes to the Affordable Care Act (also known as Obamacare) instead of repealing it. He had previously called on Congress to renew the Children’s Health Insurance Program (CHIP) after its funding lapsed in September 2017.

McAdams does not support a "Medicare-for-all" type plan, saying he doesn't think it is an approach that would "work for [his] constituents."

Immigration

McAdams has called for comprehensive immigration reform that includes secured borders, increased legal immigration, and a permanent solution for participants in the Deferred Action for Childhood Arrivals (DACA) program, also known as Dreamers. He also supports the principles in the Utah Compact.

During the 2018 election campaign McAdams opposed President Trump's plans to build a wall on the southern U.S. border with Mexico. During the 2018–19 government shutdown, McAdams said he could accept additional border protection funding, potentially including a wall, if it were part of a compromise bill that included immigration reform and "a fix for the Dreamers and DACA." The government shutdown had centered on Trump's demands for additional funds to construct a wall and the unwillingness of House Democrats to agree to it.

McAdams has expressed strong concern to the Trump administration about its plan to rescind visas for immediate family members of H-1B legal immigrants. H-1B visa holders are skilled workers who immigrate with company sponsorship. H-4 visas, which the plan would affect, are issued to their spouses and children under 21.

LGBT rights

McAdams supports same-sex marriage. After the Supreme Court ruled in Obergefell v. Hodges that same-sex couples have the right to marry, McAdams stated: "As Justice Kennedy stated in his opinion, 'The right of same-sex couples to marry is derived from the Fourteenth Amendment's guarantee of equal protection.' This decision enshrines what I've long believed—that all families should be treated equally under the law."

In 2019 McAdams voted for the Equality Act, which would legally prohibit discrimination on the basis of sexual orientation and gender identity in employment, housing, public accommodations, public education, federal funding, credit, and the jury system. Despite his vote, McAdams has stated he "do[es]n't think it's perfect" and supports continued dialogue and refinement of the bill.

President Trump
Before the Trump–Ukraine scandal, McAdams had been cautious about the prospect of impeaching President Trump, or opposed it outright. For instance, after the Mueller investigation, McAdams said, "if the Mueller report supports the conclusion that no additional criminal matters are unresolved, then it is time for the country and the Congress to move on."

After the whistle-blower complaint was released to the public, McAdams expressed support for an impeachment inquiry. He said an inquiry was necessary because Trump had "refus[ed] to further cooperate with congressional oversight, without an impeachment inquiry." On December 18, 2019, McAdams voted for both articles of impeachment against Trump. Two days earlier, he had announced his intention to vote for impeachment, saying, "for me, the evidence is clear" that Trump attempted to undermine the 2020 presidential election by soliciting aid from Ukraine to help his own reelection efforts. McAdams considered the impeachment vote a choice between "two really bad options.” A poll of McAdams's constituents taken shortly before the vote found that 42% were more likely to support McAdams if he voted for impeachment, and 37% were less likely.

McAdams criticized Speaker Nancy Pelosi for ripping up her copy of Trump's 2020 State of the Union Address. McAdams called the action "very disappointing" and said "we have a lot of things to celebrate" about the Trump administration, including the economy and jobs.

Electoral history

Personal life
McAdams is one of six children. He is a member of the Church of Jesus Christ of Latter-day Saints (LDS Church), and served a mission to Brazil in the mid-1990s. McAdams and his wife, Julie, have four children.

During the COVID-19 pandemic, McAdams announced he had tested positive for COVID-19 on March 18, 2020. He was the second sitting member of Congress to test positive, after Mario Díaz-Balart earlier that day. On March 22, McAdams announced that he had been hospitalized since March 20 due to a "severe shortness of breath" related to COVID-19. He was released from the hospital on March 28.

See also
 Politics of Utah
 List of United States representatives from Utah
 United States House of Representatives

References

External links 

|-

|-

|-

1974 births
21st-century American politicians
Latter Day Saints from Utah
Columbia Law School alumni
Davis Polk & Wardwell lawyers
Democratic Party members of the United States House of Representatives from Utah
Lawyers from New York City
Living people
Mayors of Salt Lake County, Utah
People from Davis County, Utah
University of Utah alumni
Utah lawyers
Democratic Party Utah state senators